Palazzo Falier is a civil building located in Venice, Italy in the Cannaregio district. The palazzo is particularly known for having been the home of Marin Falier, Doge of the Republic of Venice, who was executed for attempting a coup d'état.

History
The palace is one of the oldest existing buildings in Venice. Erected in a primitive form during the 11th century, the palace was destroyed by fire and rebuilt in 1105. Later, the structure was a subject of numerous alterations, which partially changed its structure. Currently, the first floor is home to a hotel business.

Architecture
The palazzo stands on a characteristic arcade of six arches, parallel to Rio dei Santi Apostoli and monumentally overlooks the adjacent campo. The façade is an example of the Byzantine influence on Venetian architecture and presents very ancient elements, among which the two raised, loosely stacked corbels. The decorations date back to the 13th and 15th centuries: two panels, two paterae and two Gothic shields. The two noble floors have quadriforas. Initially they were pentaforas, but the leftmost arches have been bricked up.

Gallery

See also
Ca' da Mosto

References

Houses completed in the 12th century
Falier
Byzantine architecture in Venice